Thabaton, lovingly called as Thaba, was a lady in Meitei mythology and folklore of Ancient Kangleipak (early Manipur). She had seven elder brothers who took care of her at every cost. She was kidnapped by Keibu Keioiba, a tiger headed man, during the absence of her siblings. After staying at the captivity of the beast for some time, she was later rescued and freed from bondage by her brothers.

The story of Thabaton and Keibu Keioiba is considered as one of the classic examples of the Meitei folk legends that is passed down through generation to generation.

Legend 
Thabaton was born as the only daughter of her parents, alongside seven sons. So, she was the darling sister of her seven elder brothers. Once all her brothers went to a distant place for some time, she was left alone at home. While leaving home, her brothers told her some code words which when told to her only, she should open the door of her house. There was an old woman at her neighboring house. Unfortunately, the old lady heard those code words. Some time after the brothers left, in one fateful night, Keibu Keioiba, the tiger headed man, entered into the house of the old lady, to devour her flesh. To save herself from being killed, the old lady told Keibu Keioiba about the young, beautiful and lonely Thabaton. Having the curiosity about her, Keibu Keioiba attempted to open the door of Thabaton's house. At first attempt, it failed. Later, when the old lady told him the code words, he recited it standing in front of the door. Hearing to the correctly said words, Thabaton misunderstood that the person might be one of her brothers. So, she opened the door from inside the house. Thus, Thabaton was abducted by Keibu Keioiba. She was held captive in the den (cave in another version of the story) of Keibu Keioiba in the middle of the thick woodlands. On the other side, after some time ("months" or "years" according to different versions of the story), her brothers returned home and found her missing. Neighborhood old lady informed them about the abduction. So, the brothers came to search for Thabaton. After some time, she was discovered by her brothers. She tricked the beast to fetch water from the stream using a bamboo pipe (bamboo container). The bamboo pipe was actually hollow from both sides, which was unknown to Keibu Keioiba. Keioiba could never fully fill the bamboo pipe, thereby taking endless times to fetch water. On the other hand, after burning down Keibu Keioiba's home, Thabaton and her brothers fled from the spot.

Code words 
The code words that was instructed to Thabaton by her brothers and later used by Keibu Keioiba to make her open the door is quoted as:

English translation of the code words is as follows:

Way of abduction 
The way lady Thabaton was abducted by Keibu Keioiba varies according to different versions of the story. 

In most versions, Thabaton was tricked by Keibu Keioiba by reciting the code words learned from the neighborhood old woman. Upon hearing the correctly said code words, she believed it might be one of her brothers for sure. And so, she opened the door. Thus, she was abducted. 

In some versions, Keibu Keioiba recited the code words correctly but his voice was easily caught up by Thabaton, as it didn't not resemble any of her brothers' voices. So, the old woman intervened the situation by asking Thabaton to lend her a needle. Thabaton told her to take it from a small hole through the wall of  the house. The old woman persuaded her to open the door a little bit so that she could directly take the needle from her hands as her eyesight wasn't good enough due to old age to take the needle through tiny hole of the house. Thabaton, feeling pity for her, opened the door a little bit. Taking advantage of the situation, Keibu Keioiba, who was hiding behind the old woman, sprang out, forcibly open the door and abducted helpless Thabaton.

Portrayal analysis 
Thabaton was described as a lady well known for "her chastity, beauty, loyalty, and obedience to her brothers". She is described as grown up in a family of poor brothers who lived from hand to mouth.

Thabaton was a witty lady. She used her wisdom during the time she was abducted by Keibu Keioiba. To leave the tracks of her, she tore her clothes into small pieces and threw them on the way she was taken away so that her brothers could find her later on.
In some versions of the story, using her wisdom, lady Thabaton planned to kill Keibu Keioiba and the treacherous old woman. She asked Keibu Keioiba that she wanted an old woman's skin. Keibu Keioiba, who dearly loved her, fulfilled her wish by killing and skinning the old woman. Later, Thabaton gave Keibu Keioiba a hollow bamboo pipe (or bamboo pole) to fetch water. Keioiba Keioiba, unknown of the hollowness of the container, went to fetch water, which took him endless efforts but always in vain. During his absence, Thabaton and her brothers burned down the house of Keibu Keioiba, by putting the woman's skin inside the house in such a way that it could be seen from outside. Upon being revealed the reality of the bamboo container and the live situation happening in his home by a crow, Keibu Keioiba immediately returned home. Seeing the woman's skin burning inside the house, thoughtless Keibu Keioiba assumed it to be Thabaton getting burned. He jumped in the house and died in fire.

In the "Encyclopedia of Goddesses and Heroines" by Patricia Monaghan, Thabaton was described as a sex slave of Keibu Keioiba.

Moral 
The story of Thabaton gives the moral that "Smart person won't open door to stranger."

Movie character 

In the 2009 animation film Keibu Keioiba (Tiger Head), the creation of Thabaton’s character was a challenge to the filmmakers.
In accordance to the filmmakers, Thabaton’s age was assumed to be between 16 to 20 years. And her eldest brother's age was assumed to be around 30. The animation artists found it hard to develop the features of the faces and physiques of Thabaton and her seven different but lookalike brothers who all belong to one family having the age range between 10 to 14 years.

The making of Thabaton’s character was extremely time consuming in comparison to others. It was because artist Bhumenjoy was not handy in creating feminine arts. Observing from the photos of women, artist Bhumenjoy later attempted to draw Thabaton's image. While doing so, he used to remember hairstyles, eyes, height, dresses and everything about the female character. Later on, the innocent looks of lady Thabaton was finally created.

Depictions in popular culture 
 Dr. Iram Babu Singh reproduced a tape-recorded version of the story of "Thabaton" narrated by Tombi Devi, from Keinou village in Manipur in February 1980. The tale was later translated by Dr. Singh. 
 In the 2009 animation feature film Keibu Keioiba (Tiger Head), the story of Thabaton being kidnapped by Keibu Keioiba and later rescued by her brothers was featured.
 In the play Yamata Amasung Keibu Keioiba, written and directed by Heisnam Tomba, under the production of the Kalakshetra Manipur, the character of Thabaton (alias Thaba) was played by Thangjam Salini.

Similar characters 
 Kushinada being rescued from the Yamata no Orochi
 Belle (Beauty and the Beast) in association with the Beast
 Andromeda being rescued from the sea monster
 Sita being abducted by Ravana

See also 
 Lairembigee Eshei
 Phouoibi Shayon
 Phou-oibi, the Rice Goddess

Notes

References

Other websites 
 Thabaton at 
 

Fictional prisoners and detainees
Keibu Keioiba
Kidnapped people
Meitei folklore
Meitei literature
Meitei mythology
Mythological rape victims